This list of tallest buildings in the United Arab Emirates (UAE) ranks skyscrapers based on official height. The tallest building in the UAE is Burj Khalifa in Dubai, which rises  and contains 163 floors. The tower has stood as both the tallest building in the world and the tallest man-made structure of any kind in the world since its completion in January 2010. 

The second tallest building in the UAE is the  Marina 101 in Dubai, which also stands as the world's fourth-tallest residential building after 432 Park Avenue, 111 West 57th Street and Central Park Tower, all of which are in New York City. The tallest buildings in the UAE are mostly located in Dubai and Abu Dhabi.

However, Dubai has more highrises than Abu Dhabi. As of 2022, Dubai has 28 completed and topped-out buildings that rise at least  in height, which is more than any other city in the world, and 97 completed and topped-out buildings that rise at least  in height, again which is more than any other city in the world. Based on the average height of the ten tallest completed buildings, Dubai has the tallest skyline in the Middle East and the world. 

In 2015, the skyline of Dubai was ranked sixth in the world with 248 buildings rising at least  in height.

Tallest buildings
This includes spires and architectural details but does not include antenna masts. An equal sign (=) following a rank indicates the same height between two or more buildings. The "Year" column indicates the year in which a building was completed.

Under construction
This lists buildings that are currently under construction in the United Arab Emirates and are expected to rise to a height of at least . Buildings under construction that have already been topped out are also included.

On-hold
This table lists buildings that were at one time under construction in Dubai and were expected to rise at least  in height, but are now on-hold. While not officially cancelled, construction has been suspended on each development.

Approved
This table lists buildings that are approved for construction in the United Arab Emirates and are expected to rise at least  in height.

Proposed
This table lists buildings that are proposed for construction in the United Arab Emirates and are expected to rise at least  in height.

Timeline of tallest buildings

This is a timeline of the buildings in UAE.

See also
 List of tallest buildings in Dubai
 List of tallest buildings in Abu Dhabi
 List of tallest buildings in Asia
 List of tallest buildings in the world

Notes
 A.  Topped out, but still under construction

References

External links
 List of tallest buildings in United Arab Emirates - CTBUH
 List of tallest buildings in United Arab Emirates - Emporis

United Arab Emirates
Tallest
Tallest buildings
United Arab Emirates